The 2018–19 season was Reading's 148th year in existence and sixth consecutive season in the Championship, and covers the period from 1 July 2018 to 30 June 2019.

Season review

Pre-season
On 18 May 2018, Reading announced that they would be taking part in a six-day pre-season training camp in Bad Erlach, Austria, with two friendlies scheduled to be played against as yet un-confirmed opposition. The EFL Cup first round draw took place on 15 June 2018, in Vietnam, drawing Reading at home against Birmingham City.

Transfers and contracts
Reading announced their first summer signing on 17 May 2018, Andy Yiadom signed a four-year contract with Reading, officially joining his new club on 1 July after the expiration of his Barnsley contract. Reading's second summer signing was announced on 5 June, with David Meyler signing a two-year contract, with the option of an additional year, on a free transfer from Hull City upon the conclusion of contract with them on 30 June. The following day, Reading announced that John O'Shea had signed a one-year contract to commence on 1 July 2018.

On 20 June, Reading announced that Andrija Novakovich had signed a new two-year contract with the club, and that he would spend the next season on loan at Eredivisie club Fortuna Sittard. Two days after, it was announced that goalkeeper Lewis Ward had also extended his contract with the club until the summer of 2020. On 2 July, Reading announced that youngsters Jamal Balogun, Andre Burley, Cameron Green, Adam Liddle, Akin Odimayo, Moroyin Omolabi and Jazz Wallace had all signed their first professional contracts with the club, whilst goalkeeper Luke Southwood had also signed a new two-year contract.

Reading signed Marc McNulty from Coventry City, on 6 July, to a four-year contract for an undisclosed fee. Two days later, it was announced that Danzell Gravenberch had re-joined KSV Roeselare on loan for second successive season.

On 10 July, Reading parted company with striker Yann Kermorgant by mutual agreement and Tennai Watson joined AFC Wimbledon on a season-long loan deal. Reading announced that they had signed Darren Sidoel from Ajax on a three-year contract on 17 July.

Academy graduate Jökull Andrésson agreed a two-year contract with Reading on 24 July, before joining Hungerford Town on loan until 1 January 2019. The following day, Joey van den Berg moved to NEC on a season-long loan deal, whilst Colchester United goalkeeper Sam Walker joined the club on a three-year deal. On 27 July, Lewis Ward joined Northampton Town on a season-long loan.

Sam Baldock signed a three-year contract with Reading, joining from Brighton and Hove Albion on 30 July. The following day, Reading confirmed that George Evans had moved to Derby County for an undisclosed fee and Sam Smith joined Oxford United on a season-long loan.

Matches
On 30 June, Reading played their first pre-season fixture away at Eastleigh. The Royals lost the fixture 2–1, with the National League side scoring a late winner through Ben Williamson. Prior to this, Paul McCallum had put the hosts ahead in the first half, before Leandro Bacuna's equaliser. Reading played two different teams composed of first team players in either half.

On 7 July, Reading faced League One outfit AFC Wimbledon at Kingsmeadow. Former-Royals loanee Kwesi Appiah put the hosts ahead, before Joe Pigott doubled their advantage just before the  break. Adrian Popa and Sam Smith levelled the game with two goals in five minutes following the restart. Egli Kaja restored Wimbledon's lead, with Kane Crichlow wrapping up a 4–2 victory for the Dons with six minutes to play. As with the Eastleigh fixture, Reading fielded separate teams in either half. A 0–0 draw with Premier League Fulham followed a week later at the Recreation Ground in Aldershot. Twenty-one different players featured for Reading.

As part of the club's training camp in Bad Erlach, Austria, the Royals faced Turkish giants Beşiktaş in Graz, as part of the Turks' preparation for their Europa League campaign. Ryan Babel and Oğuzhan Özyakup put Beşiktaş into a two-goal lead in the second half, before Sam Smith and Mark McNulty levelled the contest in the final ten minutes. On the 20 July, Reading faced former Russian champions Rubin Kazan in Ilz with the sides playing out a 0–0 draw.

On 28 July, Reading played their only home match of pre-season with the visit of Crystal Palace. The Premier League side won 4–0, with goals from Alexander Sørloth, Wilfried Zaha (two) and James Tomkins, rounding of a winless pre-season for Reading.

August
Reading opened the season with a 2–1 home defeat against Derby County on 3 August. Reading opened the scoring in the 52nd minute through Jón Daði Böðvarsson, before Mason Mount equalised in the 60th minute and Tom Lawrence scored a last minute header to seal the victory for Derby County. Reading's second game of the season saw them travel to Nottingham Forest on 11 August. A single Hillal Soudani goal in the 68th minute saw the host emerge victorious, and Reading dropping to the foot of the table. On 14 August Reading hosted Birmingham City in the First Round of the EFL Cup, with goals from Yakou Méïté and John Swift securing Reading's first win of the season and their place in the Second Round of the League Cup.

On 15 August, Axel Andrésson signed a new contract with Reading until the summer of 2020, and then immediately joined Norwegian OBOS-ligaen club Viking FK on loan until the end of their season.

On 17 August, goalkeeper Liam Driscoll joined Hungerford Town on an emergency loan after Jökull Andrésson was ruled out for a couple of week due to injury in a prior game.

On 20 August, Reading announced the signing of winger Josh Sims on a season-long loan deal from Southampton.

On 31 August, Reading announced that Saeid Ezatolahi had joined the club on a season-long loan deal from Rostov, and that Liam Moore had signed a new five-year contract, keeping him at Reading until the summer of 2023.

September
A 2–1 defeat to Sheffield Wednesday on 1 September means Reading suffer their  most  winless season in their 147-year history despite Liam Moore's late header in the 78th minute.

On 7 September, goalkeeper George Legg joined Aldershot Town on a one-month loan deal.

On 12 September, Reading confirmed that Brian Tevreden had left the club to become Chief Executive at K.S.V. Roeselare, with Gianluca Nani taking over as Sporting Director.

October
On 3 October, Reading announced that Yakou Méïte had signed a new contract with Reading, until the summer of 2022.

On 5 October 2018, Gabriel Osho joined Aldershot Town on loan until 4 November 2018, whilst Ade Shokunbi joined Billericay Town until January 2019.

November
On 7 November, Gabriel Osho had his loan with Aldershot Town extended until the New Year, with Josh Barrett joining Osho at Aldershot Town on 10 November, signing an initial one-month loan deal
On 16 November, George Legg joined Braintree Town on a month-long loan deal, whilst Adam Liddle and Joel Rollinson signed youth loan moves with Eastbourne Borough until 16 December.

On 19 November, Ron Gourlay left his role as CEO of Reading with immediate effect.

December
On 3 December, Reading were drawn away to Manchester United by Ruud Gullit and Paul Ince.

Paul Clement was sacked as manager on 6 December, with U23 manager Scott Marshall taking temporary charge of the first team, and Gabriel Osho being recalled early from his loan deal with Aldershot Town. The following day, 7 December, Gianluca Nani left the club by mutual consent less than three months after joining Reading.

On 16 December, young midfielder Tyler Frost joined Havant & Waterlooville on a month-long loan deal.
On 20 December, Reading announced that Adrian Popa had moved to Ludogorets Razgrad on loan for the rest of the season, with Axel Andrésson moving to Viking FK on permanent deal the following day.

On 21 December, Wealdstone announced the signing of Ramarni Medford-Smith on loan for one-month.

Following Reading's 1–0 home defeat to Middlesbrough on 22 December, Reading announced the appointment of José Gomes as their new manager.

On 24 December, goalkeeper Luke Southwood joined Eastleigh on a one-month loan deal.

January

Transfers
On 29 December 2018, Oxford United announced that Sam Smith would return to Reading earl from his loan deal, after they'd activated a clause in the contract.
On 3 January 2019, Pelle Clement left the club to join Eredivisie club PEC Zwolle, who were managed by Ex-Reading manager Jaap Stam. The following day Ben House joined Swindon Town on loan until the end of the season, whilst Darren Sidoel joined K.S.V. Roeselare on loan until the end if the season.

On 7 January, Reading announced that David Edwards had left the club to re-join Shrewsbury Town, whilst Josh Sims' loan deal had been ended early and he'd returned to Southampton, and Ovie Ejaria joined on loan until the end of the season from Liverpool.

On 9 January, Lewis Baker joined Reading on loan for the remainder of the season from Chelsea.

On 14 January, Reading announced that Lewis Ward's loan with Northampton Town had ended early, and that he would join Forest Green Rovers on loan for the remainder of the season.
On 18 January, Reading announced that George Legg had joined Boreham Wood on loan until the end of the season, Sam Smith had joined Shrewsbury Town until the end of the season, and Tyler Frost and Ramarni Medford-Smith had extended their loans with Havant & Waterlooville and Wealdstone respectively for an additional month.
On 22 January, Reading announced the singing of Nélson Oliveira on loan from Norwich City until the end of the season. The next day, 23 January, Emiliano Martínez joined on loan from Arsenal for the remainder of the season.
On 24 January, Luke Southwood extended his loan deal with Eastleigh until the end of the season. The following day Matt Miazga became the second Chelsea   players to join Reading on loan for the rest of the season.
On 29 January, Gabriel Osho joined Bristol Rovers on loan for the remainder of the season, whilst Tiago Ilori moved permanently to Sporting CP for an undisclosed fee. On 31 January, transfer deadline day, Leandro Bacuna left the club for Cardiff City on an undisclosed fee, and David Meyler and Marc McNulty left the club on loan for the remainder of the season, joining Coventry City and Hibernian respectively.

February
On 6 February, Salisbury announced that Liam Driscoll had joined them on loan, replacing follow Reading youth keeper James Hillson who'd moved to Arsenal on loan.
On 10 February, Vito Mannone joined Minnesota United on loan terms which run until 1 January 2020.

On 25 February, Andy Rinomhota signed a new contract with Reading, lasting until the summer of 2022. The following day, Tom McIntyre, Teddy Howe and Jordan Holsgrove extended their contracts until the summer of 2021, Tom Holmes signed a new contract until the summer of 2022, and Sone Aluko moved to Beijing Renhe on loan until the end of the 2019 season.

March
On 12 March, Ryan East signed a new contract, until the summer of 2021, and made his first team debut against Leeds United.

April
On 17 April, Reading announced that Macron would be the team's new kit supplier for three seasons beginning at the start of the 2019–20 season.

May
On 10 May Reading announced that they had offered new contracts to Tyler Frost, Adam Liddle, Ramarni Medford-Smith, Adam Desbois, Marcel Elva-Fountaine and Roberto Nditi and a first professional deal to Imari Samuels. Reading also confirmed that first team members George Legg, Anssi Jaakkola, Paul McShane, Danzell Gravenberch, Callum Harriott and Joey van den Berg would all leave the club following the completion of their contracts at the end of June, with John O'Shea retiring from football. Also leaving the club would be youngsters Jamal Balogun, Cameron Green, Moroyin Omolabi, Joel Rollinson, Ademola Shokunbi, Jazz Wallace, Jacob Pemberton, James Hillson. Shamar Moore, Terrance Saydee, Khalid Simmo and Thomas Stevens.

On 27 May 2019, Michael Olise was called up to the France at the 2019 Toulon Tournament, whilst the following day Danny Loader was called up to represent England, and Josh Barrett to represent Republic of Ireland.

On 28 May, youth team goalkeeper Coniah Boyce-Clarke agreed to sign a professional contract which Reading, until the summer of 2023, to commence the summer after his 17th birthday. On the same day, Claudio Osorio, Nelson Abbey and Malachi Talent-Aryeetey agreed to sign professional terms with the club once they turn 17.

Transfers

In

Out

Loans in

Loans out

Released

Squad

On loan

Left club during season

Friendlies

Competitions

Championship

League table

Result summary

Results by matchday

Results

EFL Cup

The second round draw was made from the Stadium of Light on 16 August.

FA Cup

Squad statistics

Appearances and goals

|-
|colspan="14"|Players away from the club on loan:

|-
|colspan="14"|Players who appeared for Reading but left during the season:

|}

Goal scorers

Clean sheets

Disciplinary record

Awards

Player of the season

Notes

References

Match reports 

Reading
Reading F.C. seasons